Ella Van Kerkhoven (born 20 November 1993) is a Belgian footballer who plays as a forward for Gent and the Belgium national team. She previously played for Oud-Heverlee Leuven, RSC Anderlecht in Belgium and for Inter Milan in Italy.

Club career
In August 2019 Van Kerkhoven agreed a transfer from RSC Anderlecht to Inter Milan of the Italian Serie A.

International career
Van Kerkhoven made her debut for the Belgium women's national team on 31 August 2018, in a 1–0 win over Romania in Botoșani. She scored the winning goal after entering play as a second half substitute.

Career statistics

International

Private life 
Van Kerkhoven lives in a same-sex relationship with Belgian footballer Diede Lemey.

References

External links
 
 

1993 births
Belgian women's footballers
Belgian expatriate footballers
Living people
Belgium women's international footballers
Expatriate women's footballers in Italy
Belgian expatriate sportspeople in Italy
Women's association football forwards
Serie A (women's football) players
Inter Milan (women) players
RSC Anderlecht (women) players
Super League Vrouwenvoetbal players
BeNe League players
Oud-Heverlee Leuven (women) players
UEFA Women's Euro 2022 players
Belgium women's youth international footballers
Association footballers' wives and girlfriends
Belgium LGBT sportspeople
LGBT association football players
Lesbian sportswomen
21st-century Belgian LGBT people